Craig Parkinson (born 11 March 1976) is an English actor and podcaster. He is perhaps best known for his roles as Shaun in the E4 series Misfits, twins Jimmy and Johnny Kray in the ITV series Whitechapel, and DI Matthew "Dot" Cottan in Line of Duty. He has also acted in several independent films, including Control, Soulboy, The Unloved and Four Lions.

Early life
Parkinson was born on 11 March 1976 in Blackpool, Lancashire. He began acting at an early age in school plays. He studied at Blackpool and The Fylde College before moving to London aged 17 to attend the Mountview Academy of Theatre Arts.

Acting career
Parkinson's early roles were small parts in long-running British television series such as Dalziel and Pascoe, The Bill, and Holby City. He made his film debut in Control (2007), a biopic of Joy Division singer Ian Curtis in which he played the role of Tony Wilson. He starred in the 2008 independent film The Taxidermist, playing The Taxidermist. The film won several awards, including Palm Springs International Short Film Festival 'Best Live Action Film over 15 minutes' and Rhode Island International Horror Film Festival 'Best Short Film'.

In 2009 he played the abusive care worker Ben in the television drama The Unloved, the directorial debut of Samantha Morton. Parkinson had previously starred alongside her in Control. The Unloved also featured Lauren Socha, with whom Parkinson would later star alongside in Misfits, as well as his wife, Susan Lynch.

In 2010 Parkinson played twins Jimmy and Johnny Kray in the ITV television series Whitechapel. The role involved a boxing scene which he prepared for by taking boxing lessons and going on a no-carb diet. He played Alan in the film SoulBoy and Cubitt in the film Brighton Rock. Towards the end of 2010 he began playing the probation worker Shaun in the E4 television series Misfits. He continued this role throughout 2011.

In 2011 he starred in the independent film Ghosted, playing the psychotic and violent prisoner Clay. The film also starred John Lynch, Parkinson's brother-in-law, and Martin Compston, with whom Parkinson had previously starred in Soulboy. In the same year, Parkinson played Tommy Flynn in the BBC sitcom In with the Flynns. Parkinson's character was described as "the star of the show" by David Butcher of the Radio Times and "the standout character of the show" by Harry Hamburg of On the Box_.

In 2011 Parkinson appeared as DS Matthew 'Dot' Cottan in the BBC Two series Line of Duty. 

In 2012 he appeared as the Reverend Horace in the BBC supernatural thriller The Secret of Crickley Hall, adapted from the novel of the same name written by James Herbert. The Secret of Crickley Hall also featured his wife. Parkinson also starred in the music video for the song "Two Fingers" by Jake Bugg.

In 2013 he starred in the ITV1 comedy drama series Great Night Out as Glyn. He also appeared as Charles Crout in Channel 4 drama The Mill.

He reprised his role as Matthew 'Dot' Cottan in 2013 for the second series of Line of Duty, and in 2015 for the third series. Cotton was promoted to the rank of DI, known now as DI Dot Cotton.

In 2015, he originated the role of Inspector Fry in Martin McDonagh's acclaimed play Hangmen, which premiered at the Royal Court Theatre before transferring to London's West End after a sold-out run, and being broadcast by National Theatre Live. He also played the compassionate missionary Dougie Raworth in Indian Summers.

In 2017, he appeared on the panel show Would I Lie to You?.
Parkinson also starred as The Piano Man (Si) in the action/comedy drama Wild Bill.

In 2021, he guest-starred in several episodes of Series 13 of Doctor Who, as the Grand Serpent.

Podcasting
Parkinson hosts the Two Shot Podcast, episodes of which typically feature interviews with actors. The Guardian favourably reviewed the podcast, describing it as the "antithesis of a luvvie-darling discussion" and Parkinson himself as a "natural interviewer". It won best culture podcast at the 2018 British Podcast Awards. The podcast is sometimes recorded at live events, such as Paddy Considine's episode at North by Northwich compered by The Charlatans.

In 2021, Parkinson hosted the "Obsessed with... Line of Duty" podcast for series 6 of Line of Duty'' on BBC Sounds.

Personal life
In his youth, he lived in Camden and Crouch End before moving to Gloucestershire with his wife. He was married to actress Susan Lynch and they have a son. They separated in 2019.

Filmography

Television

Film

Theatre

References

External links

Parkinson's profile on Troika Talent

1976 births
Living people
21st-century English male actors
English male television actors
English male film actors
English male stage actors
English podcasters
People from Blackpool
Male actors from Lancashire
People from the London Borough of Camden
People from Crouch End